Boorara could refer to:

Boorara, Western Australia, a small town in Western Australia.
Boorara Station, a pastoral lease in Queensland, Australia.
HMT Boorara, the name under which SS Pfalz sailed from 1914 to 1926